Dipalpur, also spelt Depalpur, is a city in the Okara District of Pakistani province of Punjab that served as headquarters of Depalpur Tehsil, the largest Tehsil of Pakistan. It is situated 25 kilometres from the district capital Okara on a bank of river Satluj in Bari Doab. It is located in the west of District Kasur.

History

Early 
Depalpur has a great historic past and is a very ancient town.It was Founded By Raja Depa Chand Bhatti. The fortified town of Dipalpur is built on an old Kushan site (40 A.D. to 172 A.D.). The fortifications themselves are very ancient; though it is impossible determine their dates. All that can be said is that they are older than the visitation of Timur in 1398 A.D. From the time of Alexander to the time of Mahmud Ghaznavi, there were no found accounts of Dipalpur. According to the Gazetteer of 1935, The modern name is claimed to have been named by Raja Deva Pala Bhatti Rajput after he re-founded the town.

Early Muslim period

Mughal and Delhi Sultanates 
However, in older times, Dipalpur fell on the way to Delhi and, as such, was considered to be a place where an invader could be engaged. Dipalpur, therefore, was one of the 3 lines of defense; the other two begin Uch Sharif, Samana, and Hansi. Ain-i-Akbari reveals that the militia force at Dipalpur, during the reign of Abul Fazal, consisted of 5,210 mounted Horsemen and 53,300 infantry. In the 14th Century, Firuz Shah Tughlaq regularly visited this place. It is also believed that he built a large Mosque outside the city, which no longer remains. At the time of Timur’s invasion, Depalpur was second to Multan in size and importance. The town, it is believed may have been deserted due to Taimurs’s invasion and drying up old Beas River. The Mughal Emperor Akbar, along with his son Saleem (Jahangir) along with their royal entourage, stayed in Dipalpur when he came to pay homage to Fariduddin Ganjshakar in 1578. Akbar named the corridor Bari Doab by combining the syllables of the names of the two rivers, Beas and Ravi River, that bounded the area.

Sufism 
Many Muslim saints have come to preach in this area. Bahawal Haq commonly known as Bahawal Sher Qalandar came from Baghdad and settled in the village of Patharwall near Dipalpur. The saint constructed a hujra (small living room) and a mosque outside the village. His grandson Shah Muqeem continued his mission. The village came to be known as Hujra Shah Muqeem. This is the place mentioned in the famous Punjabi love story Mirza Sahiban, in which Jati Sahiban came here are prayed, although there is no historical evidence to that. A Muslim saint named as Saayin Abdul Razaq stayed in Dipalpur and later on he started his volunteer activity for local people and after his death he was buried in city. Now, his death place is known as Razaqia Darbar.

Mongols 
The Mongols invaded this part of the country repeatedly and they were checked at Dipalpur by Ghiyas-ud-Din Balban and his son Muhammad Khan, during their last invasion of Punjab in 1285 A.D. Pir Muhammad Khan Mangol (also called Samar Khan) was defeated at Dipalpur but during the pursuit of the retreating Mongols, Muhammad Khan was killed. It is believed that Shahzada Muhammad Khan is laid to rest in a small tomb to the west of the Badshahi Mosque. Conformation from any authentic sources is, however, not available.

Notable residents

Qaiser Shehzad (born 1986), cricketer
Manzoor Wattoo (born 1939), politician

References 

Cities and towns in Okara District
History of Pakistan